Miguel Rojas may refer to:

 Miguel Rojas (footballer), a Colombian retired footballer
 Miguel Rojas (baseball), a Venezuelan baseball player